Philip Darnall (born 1604), was an English barrister. His son Henry Darnall, (1645–1711), emigrated to North America, where he became the Proprietary Agent of George Calvert, the first Lord Baltimore, (1579–1632), and George Calvert's son, Cecilius Calvert, second Lord Baltimore, (1605–1675) and the founder of Maryland.

Early life
Philip Darnall was the son of Henry Darnall (1564–1607) and Mary Tooke of "Bird's Place" in Essendon, Hertfordshire, England.  Henry Darnall's memorial stone in the parish church was described in 1826 as bearing the following inscription:

Career
Philip Darnall became a barrister like his father. He is said to have been secretary to George Calvert, and to have converted to Catholicism along with Calvert while the two were on an extended diplomatic mission to France, but this is doubtful. According to the Catholic Encyclopedia, Calvert converted in 1624.  The mission to France took place in 1610, when Darnall was still a child.

Family life

Philip Darnall's brother Ralph, also a barrister, was Clerk to the Parliament during the Protectorate.  Ralph Darnall's daughter Mary married Charles Calvert, son and heir of the Proprietor of Maryland, Cecil Calvert, 2nd Lord Baltimore.

Philip Darnall's wife was Mary Breton, daughter of Sir Henry Breton (or Britton) by his wife, Anne Yate, daughter of Edward Yate of Buckland, Berkshire, England, with whom he had at least two sons:  

 Colonel Henry Darnall (1645–1711) emigrated to Maryland, where he received political appointments including Deputy Governor under Charles Calvert, third Lord Baltimore, (1637–1715), and large grants of land from the Calverts, and thus amassed a large fortune.

 John Darnall (1647-1684) also emigrated to Maryland, where he settled at Portland Manor in Anne Arundel County and married Susanna Maria Bennett, daughter of Richard Bennett, Jr. (died 1667), by his wife, Henrietta Maria Neale.  His will, proved 18 February 1684, named brother Col. Henry Darnall as executor.

References
 Davis, George Lynn-Lachlan (1855).  The Day-Star of American Freedom, p.267. Retrieved 22 February 2010.

Notes

Year of death unknown
1604 births
17th-century English lawyers
English lawyers
People from Essendon, Hertfordshire